Charly Coronel Suarez (born August 14, 1988) is a Filipino professional boxer. He is the current WBA & IBF Asia Super Featherweight Champion. As an amateur, Suarez represented the Philippines at the 2016 Summer Olympics.

Professional career 
Suarez, a 2016 Olympian, turned professional in 2019 and has made up for his late start in the pros, fighting five times in 2022 against solid competition. He stopped Indonesian Defry Palulu in two rounds on December in Vietnam. The Paul Fleming fight was his second straight fight abroad, winning a 12 round TKO.

Professional boxing record

Titles in boxing

 IBF Inter-Continental Super Featherweight title
 IBO Inter-Continental Super Featherweight title
 WBA Oceania Super Featherweight title
 WBC Asian Boxing Council Super Featherweight title
 WBA Asia Super Featherweight title
 GAB Super Featherweight title

References

External links

Charly Suarez −2014 Asian Games Athlete Profile

1988 births
Living people
Asian Games medalists in boxing
Boxers at the 2010 Asian Games
Boxers at the 2014 Asian Games
Filipino male boxers
Boxers from Davao del Norte
Asian Games silver medalists for the Philippines
Boxers at the 2016 Summer Olympics
Olympic boxers of the Philippines
Medalists at the 2014 Asian Games
Southeast Asian Games medalists in boxing
Southeast Asian Games gold medalists for the Philippines
Southeast Asian Games bronze medalists for the Philippines
Competitors at the 2009 Southeast Asian Games
Competitors at the 2011 Southeast Asian Games
Competitors at the 2017 Southeast Asian Games
Competitors at the 2019 Southeast Asian Games
Lightweight boxers